Wilhelm Hegeler (25 February 1870 in Varel, Grand Duchy of Oldenburg – 8 October 1943 in Irschenhausen) was a German novelist.

Biography
He studied law at the universities of Munich, Geneva and Berlin, traveled extensively, and returned to Munich in 1895 to settle down to literary work. He moved to Berlin in 1897 and to Weimar in 1906.

Writings
He engaged in the production, at first, of naturalistic novels dealing with the life of the population along the river Rhine, later, of humorous satires. Their popularity in Germany was very great, and Hegeler's books frequently appeared among the lists of best sellers for certain years (1905, for instance).

His works include:
 Sonnige Tage (Berlin, 1898)
 Ingenieur Horstmann (Berlin, 1900)
 Das Ärgernis (Berlin, 1907)

Evaluation
His stories were at first characterized by a rather sharp and painful naturalism, but later assumed a convincing and powerful realism.

Notes

References

External links
 

1870 births
1943 deaths
People from Varel
People from the Grand Duchy of Oldenburg
20th-century German novelists
Writers from Lower Saxony
Ludwig Maximilian University of Munich alumni
University of Geneva alumni
Humboldt University of Berlin alumni
German male novelists
20th-century German male writers